Michel M. J. Shore (born March 21, 1948) is a judge currently serving on the Federal Court of Canada.

In 2016–2017, he wrote a weekly sonnet entitled 'Torah In Verse' on the weekly Torah portion.

In 2021, Justice Shore wrote 15 sonnets as commentary on the Psalms of Ascent, inspired by R' Shaya Treitel obm.

References

For Additional Resources See https://www.michelshore.com/

For Additional Resources See https://www.michelshore.com/

Tales of David: Simple Wisdom for Complicated Times

1948 births
Living people
Judges of the Federal Court of Canada